The ace of clubs is a playing card in the standard 52-card deck.

Ace of Clubs may also refer to:

Ace of Clubs (comics), a DC Comics supervillain
Ace o' Clubs, a DC Comics Comics bar owned by Bibbo Bibowski 
Ace of Clubs (musical), a 1949 musical by Noël Coward
Ace of Clubs Records, a British record label owned by Decca Records
The Ace of Clubs, an alias used by British recording artist Luke Vibert
Ace of Clubs (film), a 1925 silent Western film by J. P. McGowan 
L'As de trèfle (The Ace of Clubs) for Sarah Bernhardt Pierre Decourcelle 1882

See also

 or 

 Ace of Diamonds (disambiguation)
 Ace of Hearts (disambiguation)
 Ace of Spades (disambiguation)
 Jack of Clubs (disambiguation)
 Queen of Clubs (disambiguation)
 King of Clubs (disambiguation)